Algirdas Butkevičius (born 19 November 1958) is a Lithuanian politician and was Prime Minister of Lithuania, serving between 2012 and 2016. He also served as the Minister of Finance from 2004 to 2005 and the Minister of Transport and Communications from 2006 to 2008. He led the Social Democratic Party of Lithuania from 2009 to 2017.

Political career
Butkevičius was born at Paežeriai village in Radviliškis district municipality. Since 1992 he is member of the Social Democratic Party of Lithuania (LSDP). He was chairman of the Vilkaviškis District section of LSDP in 1995–1997, deputy chairman of the LSDP in 1999–2005 (re-elected in 2001), and chairman of the LSDP since 2009.

In 1996 and 2000, he was elected to the Seimas (parliament). From 2004 to 2005 he served as Minister of Finance and from 2006 to 2008 as Minister of Transport and Communications.

Butkevičius was the LSDP's candidate in the 2009 presidential election, placing second with 11.83% of the votes. As of 2010, he is the chairman of the LSDP.

During the 2012 parliamentary election, Butkevičius was among the few candidates who were elected in the first round of the popular vote.

On 22 November 2012 he was elected by the Seimas to be Prime Minister-designate. He was appointed as Prime Minister by presidential decree on 7 December 2012 and his cabinet was sworn in on 13 December, following the approval of the governmental program by the parliament.

In the beginning of 2022, Butkevičius joined the new party Union of Democrats "For Lithuania", founded by Saulius Skvernelis, who succeeded Butevičius as prime minister in 2016.

Education and career timeline 
1977 graduation from Šeduva Secondary School, district of Radviliškis.
1977-1979 Military service in Signals-Communications Troops of the Soviet Army, rank Junior Sergeant.
1984 Diploma of Engineering Economist, Faculty of Economics, Vilnius Civil Engineering Institute (currently Vilnius Gediminas Technical University) 
1990–1991 Diploma of Technical Manager, Lithuanian Management Academy 
1995 Master's Degree in Management, Kaunas University of Technology
1994 Traineeship, Management Academy in Würzburg, Germany. 1998, 1999, 2001 – traineeships in the United States of America and Denmark.
2008 Doctor's Degree in Economics
1982–1985 Industrial Association "Žemūktechnika", Vilkaviškis district
1985–1990 Architect, Executive Committee of Vilkaviškis district; Inspector, State Construction and Architecture Unit, Vilkaviškis district
1991–1995 Deputy Governor, Vilkaviškis district
1995–1996 Director of Market Research and Marketing, Joint Stock Company AB Vilkauta 
1996–2008 Member of the 7th, 8th, 9th and 10th Seimas, elected in Vilkaviškis electoral constituency No 68 as candidate of the Lithuanian Social Democratic Party. He has served in the following committees: Committee on Budget and Finance (chairman in 2001–2004), Committee on European Affairs (2005–2006) and Committee on Economics (2006–2008)
2004–2005 Minister of Finance, 12th and 13th Governments of the Republic of Lithuania
2006–2008 Minister of Transport and Communications, 14th Government of the Republic of Lithuania
1990–1997 and 2000–2002 Member of the Municipal Council of Vilkaviškis district
1995–1997 Member of the Municipal Board of Vilkaviškis district
7 December 2012 appointed Prime Minister by Presidential Decree

Personal life
In addition to his native Lithuanian, he speaks fluent Russian. His wife is Janina, and they have one daughter, Indrė.

References

External links 

Algirdas Butkevicius: euro adoption in Lithuania to take place in 2013–2014 (The Baltic Course)

|-

|-

|-

1958 births
21st-century Lithuanian politicians
Living people
Members of the Seimas
Ministers of Finance of Lithuania
Ministers of Transport and Communications of Lithuania
Prime Ministers of Lithuania
Recipients of the Order of the Cross of Terra Mariana, 1st Class
Social Democratic Party of Lithuania politicians
Social Democratic Labour Party of Lithuania politicians
Vilnius Gediminas Technical University alumni
Vice-mayors of places in Lithuania
Independent politicians in Lithuania
People from Radviliškis District Municipality